Mooreville is a rural residential locality in the local government area (LGA) of Burnie in the North-west and west LGA region of Tasmania. The 2016 census has a population of 303 for the state suburb of Mooreville.
While there are some residential allotments, the area is mainly agricultural farming land.

Services are located in the neighbouring suburb of East Cam.
The Mooreville Training Track (formerly Armytage) is an equine stud.

There was a former quarry in the area that was proposed to be infilled as land reclamation.

There are a few properties in the area and also in the neighbouring suburb of Ridgley that have exquisite gardens such as
the Emu Valley Rhododendron Garden.

History 
An early settler in the district, James Munce, named his property "Mooreville" after his parents' estate in England. Mooreville was gazetted as a locality in 1966.

Geography
The Emu River forms the south-eastern boundary, and Cooee Creek forms most of the western.

Road infrastructure 
The B18 route (Ridgley Highway) passes through from south-west to south-east. Route C110 (Mooreville Road) starts at an intersection with B18 on the southern boundary and runs north through the locality.

References

External links 
Emu Valley Rhododendron Garden

Suburbs of Burnie, Tasmania
Towns in Tasmania